Abdulrahman Mohamed Saad (born July 7, 1996) is a Qatari-Egyptian professional basketball player for Zamalek. He previously played nine seasons for Al-Gharafa of the Qatari Basketball League.

He represented Qatar's national basketball team at the 2015 FIBA Asia Championship in Changsha, China. There, he recorded most steals for his team.

References

External links
 Asia-basket.com Profile
 2016 FIBA Asia Challenge Profile
 2015 FIBA Asia Championship Profile

1996 births
Living people
Qatari people of Egyptian descent
Guards (basketball)
People from Doha
Qatari men's basketball players
Al-Gharafa SC basketball players